The Barnard Medal for Meritorious Service to Science was established in 1889 by the will of Columbia University president Frederick A. P. Barnard, and has been awarded by Columbia University, based on recommendations by the National Academy of Sciences, every 5 years since 1895. It is not to be confused with the Barnard Medal of Distinction.

Winners 

 1895 - John William Strutt, Lord Rayleigh, William Ramsay
 1900 - Wilhelm Röntgen
 1905 - Henri Becquerel
 1910 - Ernest Rutherford
 1915 - William Henry Bragg, William Lawrence Bragg
 1920 - Albert Einstein
 1925 - Niels Bohr
 1930 - Werner Heisenberg
 1935 - Edwin Hubble
 1940 - Frédéric Joliot-Curie, Irène Joliot-Curie
 1945 - No award
 1950 - Enrico Fermi
 1955 - Merle Tuve
 1960 - I. I. Rabi
 1965 - William Alfred Fowler
 1970 - No award
 1975 - Louis Plack Hammett
 1980 - André Weil
 1985 - Benoit Mandelbrot
 1990 - No award
 1995 - No award
 2000 - No award
 2005 - No award
 2010 - No award

Establishment of the Barnard Medal for Meritorious Service to Science 

In awarding the Barnard Medal in 1910 President Butler of Columbia University said :

See also 

 List of general science and technology awards 
 List of physics awards

References 

Awards of the United States National Academy of Sciences
American science and technology awards
Awards and prizes of Columbia University
Civil awards and decorations
Awards established in 1895
1895 establishments in New York City